Dejan Todorović (born 29 May 1994) is a Serbian professional basketball player for Covirán Granada of the Liga ACB.

Professional career
Todorović began his career in the KK Sport Key from Novi Sad in 2009 where he was trained by former basketball player Dragan Lukovski until 2011 when he moved to Unicaja's junior team, during the 2011–12 season. In 2012, he was loaned to the Unicaja's reserve team. In 2014, he was loaned to Bilbao Basket.

On March 1, 2015, the basque derby with Baskonia finished with a brawl where he and Tornike Shengelia of Baskonia were disqualified and twelve players were ejected due to court invasion during the fight.

With four seconds left and Bilbao winning by a huge margin, despite the referee's call for a travelling, he was going to dunk when he was hit by Shengelia. After this, the Serbian player pushed Shengelia and the Georgian forward reacted with a punch. After this, all the players who were in the bench came into the court and started the brawl. When Shengelia was leaving the court after the disqualifying foul, he apologized to a child who was in the first row of the arena.

The ACB announced this brawl would have severe consequences and sanctions and would talk with the Spanish Basketball Federation for changing the disciplinary regulations. On March 5, the league provisionally suspended Todorović and Shengelia until the final resolution of the case.

Both clubs claimed to have the same sanctions than in 2004, when the brawl Real Madrid and Estudiantes occurred. Finally, on March 11, the Disciplinary Judge accorded to suspend Tornike Shengelia for five games, him for four and a €3,000 fine to Bilbao Basket player Dairis Bertāns and to Baskonia brothers Mamadou and Ilimane Diop.

In 2015, he signed a new two-year contract extension with Unicaja and he was loaned to Bilbao Basket.

On July 23, 2016, he left Unicaja and signed a three-year contract with Bilbao Basket. Todorović played for Chicago Bulls during the 2017 NBA Summer League.

On August 9, 2018, he signed a one-year deal with UCAM Murcia of the Liga ACB. On July 9, 2019, Todorović signed a one-year deal with MoraBanc Andorra of the Liga ACB.

On July 8, 2020, he has signed with Iberostar Tenerife of the Liga ACB. He tore his ACL on his left knee on September 6, during a friendly game.

On August 11, 2022, he has signed with Covirán Granada of the Liga ACB.

International career
In November 2017, Todorović made his debut for the Serbian national team in the qualification for the 2019 FIBA World Cup. In July 2019, national team head coach Saša Đorđević included him on the preliminary list of 18 players being considered for the final roster for the FIBA World Cup, but following the camp,  he was cut from the 14-man squad as the team began its pre-tournament friendlies.

Career statistics

Euroleague

|-
| style="text-align:left;"| 2013–14
| style="text-align:left;"| Unicaja
| 5 || 0 || 1.28 || 1.000 || .000 || .000 || .2 || .2 || .2 || .0 || .4 || .4

Domestic leagues

|-
| style="text-align:left;"| 2014–15
| style="text-align:left;"| Bilbao
| 31 || 10 || 9.0 || .430 || .222 || .818 || 1.19 || .5 || .5 || .0 || 3.6 || 2.2
|-
| style="text-align:left;"| 2015–16
| style="text-align:left;"| Bilbao
| 0 || 0 || 0.0 || .000 || .000 || .000 || .0 || .0 || .0 || .0 || .0 || .0

See also 
 List of Serbian NBA Summer League players

References

External links
 Dejan Todorović at acb.com
 Dejan Todorović at euroleague.net
 Dejan Todorović at eurobasket.com
 

1994 births
Living people
Baloncesto Málaga players
BC Andorra players
Bilbao Basket players
Bosnia and Herzegovina expatriate basketball people in Serbia
Bosnia and Herzegovina men's basketball players
CB Axarquía players
CB Canarias players
CB Murcia players
Fundación CB Granada players
Liga ACB players
People from Mrkonjić Grad
Serbian expatriate basketball people in Andorra
Serbian expatriate basketball people in Spain
Serbian men's basketball players
Serbs of Bosnia and Herzegovina
Small forwards